Nirmal Furniture is furniture made in Nirmal, Adilabad, Telangana, India. It received Geographical Indication rights in 2009.  It is handmade wooden furniture.

See also 
 List of Geographical Indications in India

References 

Culture of Telangana
Indian woodwork
Geographical indications in Telangana
Indian furniture